Since its inaugural season in 1973, the World Rally Championship has been supported by a series of additional categories. These categories, created and endorsed by the Fédération Internationale de l'Automobile (FIA)—the governing body of motorsport—were created to encourage participation from entries in classes that would otherwise be ineligible to score points in the World Championship or its primary feeder series, the World Rally Championship-2 and World Rally Championship-3. Over time, these support categories were created and changed in line with trends within the sport itself and motorsport as a whole.

Drive DMACK Fiesta Trophy

The Drive DMACK Fiesta Trophy was a series run between 2014 and 2016. It was created after Citroën won the bid to supply cars for the Junior World Rally Championship from M-Sport. The M-Sport prepared Ford Fiesta R2s that had been used for the Junior World Rally Championship were made available to crews, with tyres supplied by DMACK. The winner of the Drive DMACK Fiesta Trophy was entered in World Rally Championship-2 with DMACK World Rally Team the following season. The competition was discontinued in 2017, with the restructured Junior World Rally Championship adopting a prize structure similar to the one used by the Drive DMACK Fiesta Trophy.

R-GT Cup
The R-GT Cup was first created in 2015 to allow GT cars to compete in rallying. With the FIA streamlining the classes of eligible cars by creating Group R, provisions were made to allow for GT cars to be entered, with the category known as R-GT. While the R-GT Cup was initially run in support of the World Rally Championship at selected events, later editions expanded the R-GT calendar to include rounds of the European Rally Championship.

WRC Trophy
The WRC Trophy was created in 2017 as a response to widespread technical changes in the World Rally Car category. These changes, which made the 2017 generation of World Rally Cars significantly faster than their predecessors meant that World Rally Cars built between 2011 and 2016 would be unable to directly compete with the newer models. Conversely, World Rally Cars built before 2017 would be faster than the Group R5 cars competing in the World Rally Championship-2. With further changes to the sporting regulations restricting the ability of privateer teams to enter 2017-specification World Rally Cars, the WRC Trophy was created to encourage privateer entries and enable older-model World Rally Cars to continue competing without threatening the position of the World Rally Championship-2 as the sport's premier feeder category. Under the WRC Trophy regulations, crews are eligible to enter up to seven rounds of the World Rally Championship, with their best six results counting towards their final points tally. WRC Trophy entrants were still eligible to score World Rally Championship points separately to the WRC Trophy.
The Trophy was discontinued after the 2017 season.

References

+